Atomistix ToolKit (ATK) is a commercial software for atomic-scale modeling and simulation of nanosystems. The software was originally developed by Atomistix A/S, and was later acquired by QuantumWise following the Atomistix bankruptcy. QuantumWise was then acquired by Synopsys in 2017.

Atomistix ToolKit is a further development of TranSIESTA-C, which in turn in based on the technology, models, and algorithms developed in the academic codes TranSIESTA, and McDCal, employing localized basis sets as developed in SIESTA.

Features 
Atomistix ToolKit combines density functional theory with non-equilibrium Green's functions for first principles electronic structure and transport calculations of 
electrode—nanostructure—electrode systems (two-probe systems)
molecules
periodic systems (bulk crystals and nanotubes)

The key features are
Calculation of transport properties of two-probe systems under an applied bias voltage
Calculation of energy spectra, wave functions, electron densities, atomic forces, effective potentials etc.
Calculation of spin-polarized physical properties
Geometry optimization
A Python-based NanoLanguage scripting environment

See also 
Atomistix Virtual NanoLab — a graphical user interface
NanoLanguage
Atomistix
Quantum chemistry computer programs
Molecular mechanics programs

References

External links 
 QuantumWise web site

Nanotechnology companies
Computational science
Computational chemistry software
Physics software
Density functional theory software
Computational physics